Mounds View Public Schools (District 621) is a Minnesota school district serving the cities of Arden Hills, Mounds View, New Brighton, North Oaks, Roseville, Shoreview, Vadnais Heights and portions of Spring Lake Park and White Bear Township. The district currently operates 13 schools and a handful of other educational programs.

The District is consistently ranked among the top 10 metro school districts.  On average, District students perform 1-3 grade levels higher than their peers in the state of Minnesota.  The District has been recognized as a state leader in providing innovative opportunities for all students.  Year after year, the district enrolls more than 80% of the students in its attendance area.

Schools

High schools
Irondale High School and Mounds View High School were both named among the best high schools in the nation by U.S. News & World Report (top 15 in the state of Minnesota) for exceeding expectations when it comes to student performance on reading and math test, and for preparing students for college.
Irondale High School
Located in New Brighton, MN, Irondale High School was founded in 1967, and serves over 1700 students. It was featured as "One of the top high schools in the country" by Newsweek.

Mounds View High School
Located in Arden Hills, MN. Mounds View High School has been an active school in District 621 since 1955, and serves over 1800 students.

Middle schools
Chippewa Middle School 
Located in North Oaks, Chippewa serves over 1100 students.

Edgewood Middle School
Located in Mounds View, MN, Edgewood serves over 600 students.

Highview Middle School
Located in New Brighton, MN, Highview serves over than 800 students.

Elementary schools
Elementary schools serve grades 1-5.
Bel Air Elementary
Located in New Brighton, MN, Bel Air serves over 700 students.

Island Lake Elementary
Located in Shoreview, MN, Island Lake serves over 700 students in the surrounding area of Shoreview, Vadnais Heights, and Arden Hills.

Pinewood Elementary School
Located in Mounds View, MN, Pinewood serves over 500 students in first through fifth grade from Mounds View and Shoreview.

Red Oak School
Located in Mounds View, MN, Red Oak serves students in kindergarten through sixth grade from Mounds View.

Sunnyside Elementary
Located in New Brighton, MN, Sunnyside serves over 500 students from Mounds View and New Brighton.

Turtle Lake Elementary 
Located in Shoreview, MN, Turtle Lake is the largest elementary school in the Mounds View Public School District, serving over 1000 students from northern Shoreview.

Valentine Hills Elementary
Located in Arden Hills, MN, Valentine Hills serves over 600 students from Arden Hills and sections of New Brighton and Roseville.

Kindergarten Centers 
 Kindergarten Center at Pike Lake Education Center
Located in New Brighton, MN.  Serves over 500 students that will go on to attend Bel Air Elementary, Pinewood Elementary, Sunnyside Elementary or Valentine Hills Elementary.
 Kindergarten Center at Snail Lake Education Center
Located in Shoreview, MN.  Serves over 300 students that will go on to attend Island Lake Elementary or Turtle Lake Elementary.

Other programs
Area Learning Center (ALC)
Located in Mounds View, MN, the Area Learning Center is a non-traditional program designed to help students meet their high school graduation requirements.
Bridges
Located in Mounds View, MN, Bridges provides rigorous academic instruction, while also focusing on meeting students' behavioral and social skills needs.
Career & Life Transition Program (CLT)
Career and Life Transition Program is a community-based initiative between the Mounds View and Roseville Public School Districts.  The CLT program is for students who are 18–21 years of age, have transition needs identified in their Individual Education Plan (IEP), and have not received a high school diploma.
Early Childhood Education Program
Three locations: Early Childhood Education Center in New Brighton; Pike Lake Education Center (see below); Snail Lake Education Center (see below);  This program serves families and their children prenatal through kindergarten entry. 
 REACH Academy (formerly Oak Grove)
Located in Roseville MN, REACH Academy offers a special education program for students in grades 8-11 from Mounds View Public Schools and several surrounding districts.

Pike Lake Education Center
Located in New Brighton, PLEC used to be Pike Lake Elementary School.  Features Pike Lake Kindergarten Center, which feeds Bel Air Elementary, Pinewood Elementary, Sunnyside Elementary, and Valentine Hills Elementary along with part of the Early Childhood Education Program.

Snail Lake Education Center
Located in Shoreview, SLEC used to be Snail Lake Elementary which closed in 2005 after celebrating about 100 years as a school.  Features Snail Lake Kindergarten Center, which feeds Island Lake Elementary and Turtle Lake Elementary along with part of the Early Childhood Education Program.

Laurentian Environmental Center
5th and 7th grade students in the school district are given the opportunity annually to attend a four-day camp at Laurentian Environmental Center, during which they learn about the wilderness and outdoor survival. Mounds View High School Orchestra students have a chance to go attend around Halloween.

References
 Mounds View Public Schools
 About Mounds View Public Schools

External links
Mounds View Public Schools
 

School districts in Minnesota
Education in Ramsey County, Minnesota